Ilsan Station is a station on the Gyeongui–Jungang Line. It is the oldest station in the city of Goyang, and the old station – built in 1933, while under Japanese rule – was designated as a national cultural asset in 2006.

External links
 Station information from Korail

Seoul Metropolitan Subway stations
Railway stations opened in 1906
Metro stations in Goyang
Cultural Heritage of early modern times of South Korea
1906 establishments in Korea